Bernaoui is a surname. Notable people with the surname include:

Hamid Bernaoui (1937–2020), Algerian footballer
Krimo Bernaoui (born 1967), Algerian volleyball player
Nassim Islam Bernaoui (born 1977), Algerian fencer
Raouf Salim Bernaoui (born 1975), Algerian fencer